Chandler Bats is an American manufacturing company based in Port St. Lucie, Florida specializing in wood baseball bats primarily made from maple trees as well as birch and ash. Chandler Bats was originally founded in 2009 by David Chandler. On June 27, 2019, Yoenis Céspedes acquired the company after David Chandler filed for bankruptcy.

History 
Furniture maker David Chandler founded Chandler bats in 2009. David started RxSport in Germantown, Pennsylvania, and quickly begain making bats in Norristown. In the first year that Chandler bats were available on the public market, they sold 11,000 bats out of a  warehouse. Chandler has increased production every year since their opening. In 2013, the company received a $500,000 investment from Benjamin Franklin Technology Partners of Southeastern Pennsylvania for expansion. A large portion of these funds was put towards purchasing more raw materials, maple and ash wood, in an effort to further increase production of bats.

References

Manufacturing companies based in Florida
Sporting goods brands
Baseball bats
2010 establishments in Florida
American companies established in 2010
Port St. Lucie, Florida